Gregorio Aglipay Cruz y Labayán (Filipino: Gregorio Labayan Aglipay Cruz; 5 May 1860 – 1 September 1940) was a former Filipino Roman Catholic priest and revolutionary who became the first head of the Iglesia Filipina Independiente, an independent Christian Church in the Philippines in the form of a nationalist church.

Known for inciting patriotic rebellion among the Filipino clergy during the Philippine Revolution and Philippine–American War, he was also a political activist who became acquainted with Isabelo de los Reyes, who would start an independent Christian Filipino Church colloquially named after him in 1902.

Aglipay was previously excommunicated by Archbishop Bernardino Norzaleda y Villa of Manila in May 1899, upon the expressed permission of Pope Leo XIII, due to his involvement in revolutionary activities. Aglipay later joined Freemasonry in May 1918, a society excommunicated by the Roman Catholic Church. Aglipay later married Pilar Jamias y Ver from Sarrat, Ilocos Norte in 1939 and then died one year later. Followers of Aglipay through the Church colloquially sometimes refer to their membership as Aglipayans.

Early life

Born in Batac, Ilocos Norte, the third child of Pedro Aglipay Cruz and Victoriana Labayan Hilario, Aglipay was an orphan who grew up in the care of relatives at the tobacco fields in the last volatile decades of the Spanish occupation of the Philippines. He bore deep grievances against the colonial Spanish government of the islands, stemming from abuses within the agricultural system. Arrested at age fourteen for not meeting his tobacco quota as a tobacco-picking worker, he later moved to the country's capital of Manila in 1876 to study law under the private tutelage of lawyer Julian Carpio with the financial help of his uncle Francisco del Amor Romas, who was a menial employee of the Dominican Sisters School of Santa Catalina.

After two years of study under Carpio, Aglipay continued his studies at the Colegio de San Juan de Letran for his third year as a working student and later at the University of Santo Tomas where he met José Rizal, a senior medical student. After obtaining his Bachelor of Arts degree in Letran, he discontinued his law studies at Santo Tomas and then entered the seminary in Vigan, Ilocos Sur in 1883 as influenced by Rizal, at age 23. He was ordained to the priesthood six years later on December 21, 1889 at the old Dominican Church in Intramuros, Manila and celebrated his first mass as an ordained Roman Catholic priest in January 1890. He later dropped Cruz in his surname and began a career as an assistant priest to Spanish friars in various parishes around the main northern island of Luzon, notably in the Roman Catholic Archdiocese of Nueva Segovia. While serving in Victoria, Tarlac, Aglipay discreetly gave aid to the revolutionaries and employed thirty carpenters who in reality were revolutionists in touch with the Katipunan group. Aglipay then organized the said revolutionists and called their group Liwanag ("Light"), a local auxiliary of the Katipunan in Victoria, Tarlac.

Philippine Revolution
In 1896, a secret society, Katipunan, was led by the Supremo, Andrés Bonifacio. Manila Archbishop Bernardino Nozaleda tasked Aglipay to confront the revolutionary leaders, offering them a level of autonomy in the future for the Philippines if they would end the rebellion. General Emilio Aguinaldo, in turn, sent Colonel Luciano San Miguel to Aglipay with the intention of getting him to join the rebellion. Aguinaldo convinced Aglipay, who appointed him as military chaplain (capellán castrense) of the revolutionary government sometime in May or June 1898.

Aglipay also later became a member of the Malolos Congress, the lone member coming from the religious sector, although he also represented his home province of Ilocos Norte, as well. On 20 October 1898, Aguinaldo elevated Aglipay to the post of Military Vicar General (Vicario General Castrense) of the revolutionaries, a position that made him head of all military chaplains in the revolution. In the course of Aglipay's journey to the north, the Philippine–American War started at the conclusion of the Spanish–American War. Aglipay interpreted his appointment as Vicar General as making him Ecclesiastical Superior to all Filipino priests, who as such should all be appointed military chaplains for the duration of the war.

Philippine–American War
When Aglipay returned to Manila and discovered that the Americans had attacked, he joined the revolution. The fighting that broke out between the U.S. and Filipino forces on 4 February 1899 prompted Aglipay to withdraw to Ilocos Norte to organize an armed resistance and was given the rank of lieutenant-general.  On 29 April 1899, Aglipay  was excommunicated by Manila Archbishop Bernardino Nozaleda for "usurpation of ecclesiastical jurisdiction," and the sentence of excommunication was exposed from May 4 to June 5 in the archiepiscopal tribunal of Manila.

Aglipay was one of the last generals to surrender to the Americans. Realizing the futility of the cause for which they had been fighting, on 28 April 1901, a month after the capture of Aguinaldo, he surrendered to Captain Edward Mann Lewis of the 20th U.S. Regular Infantry in Laoag, to prevent further casualties from his men as he saw less chances of winning from the much dominant American troops. After his surrender, he later moved back to the already-American-occupied Manila and worked on reconciling with the Roman Catholic Church. The Americans officially ended the war on 2 July 1902 and granted full amnesty to all persons in the Philippines who had participated in the conflict.

After the war
Following the end of the war in 1902, writer-activist Isabelo de los Reyes was working towards the formation of a nationalist church, that is independent of Rome. Spanish friars were still in control of the parishes all throughout the country at the time of the American occupation. On 3 August, de los Reyes proclaimed the establishment of the church and suggested that Aglipay be its first head bishop. Aglipay, a devout Catholic at the time even after he had been excommunicated, was reluctant as he was initially against a schism, but eventually accepted de los Reyes' offer to establish an independent church on September 6, 1902 and was appointed as the first Supreme Bishop or Obispo Máximo of the "Philippine Independent Church" (officially Iglesia Filipina Independiente, also referred as the "Aglipayan Church" after him).

According to renowned historian Teodoro Agoncillo, Aglipay finally decided to join the new church after his talks with Francisco Foradada, a Spaniard Jesuit priest and author, backfired. Knowing that Aglipay was influential with the Filipino clergy, the Jesuits assigned Foradada to persuade Aglipay from returning to the Roman Catholic fold in order to further prevent the schism from succeeding. Aglipay was allegedly offered to be appointed bishop or archbishop with a large sum of money thrown in if he would return. Aglipay would have sign a document of confession to the Roman Catholic Church but on condition of assurance that by signing the document, the issues of the Filipino Catholic priests would be solved, and that the Filipino clergy would be appointed to the posts formerly held by the Spanish regulars. Foradada responded by tactlessly asking "why would he care about Filipino priests since the world knows that they are vicious and hopelessly inefficient." It was believed that Aglipay felt insulted by Foradada's brash comments that he angrily lunged at him and held him by the nape demanding to withdraw his remarks as Foradada, terrified, fell on his knees. Subsequently, Aglipay reputedly walked out from the meeting and threw away the document. Although he had already decided to join the new church after his first failed conference with the Jesuits, Aglipay was still disinclined to accept the supreme bishop post. He even met with American Protestant leaders and tried to persuade them to assist and join them in their new Filipinized church in order "to divide the ranks of the Catholics."

Aglipay also suggested that Filipino priests would be appointed to higher ranks on the clergy. The American Protestants declined Aglipay's proposal as they found the new church "too Roman in its ritual" and "too rationalistic in its theology." They were also adamant on having Filipino church leaders at the time as they were "enjoying the feeling of superiority." The Jesuits tried to negotiate again with Aglipay years after the establishment of the new church through Spanish Father Joaquin Villalonga. Pope Pius X had approved to grant Aglipay pardon if the new church went back to the Roman Catholic fold, but Aglipay was already persistent to continue the Iglesia Filipina Independiente.

Aglipay celebrated his first mass as the de facto Supreme Bishop on October 26, 1902. On January 18, 1903, Aglipay was consecrated to the position of Supreme Bishop by the Church's Bishops of Isabela, Cagayan, Pangasinan, Abra, Nueva Ecija, Cavite, and Manila. As Supreme Bishop, he allied himself with the nationalist and most radical political parties during his time like the Sakdalistas and later on even with the Socialist and Communist Parties.

During the theological discussions he attended while visiting other churches on his travels abroad, Aglipay later rejected the belief in the Trinity and became theologically accepting of the main Unitarian belief, however, a significant number from his own Church refused to accept his amended theology. Aglipay's unitarian and progressive theological ideas were evident in his "novena", the "Pagsisiyam sa Birhen sa Balintawak", 1925 and its English translation, "Novenary of the Motherland",  1926.

Later life and legacy

Despite being a Christian leader, Aglipay, like other revolutionaries, later joined Freemasonry. Aglipay ran for elections as President of the Commonwealth under the Republican Party along with Partido Komunista ng Pilipinas' candidate Norberto Nabong in a joint Republican-Communist Party ticket in 1935, but lost to Manuel L. Quezon and Sergio Osmeña of the Nacionalista Party, respectively.

Also referred to as Apo Aglipay by his followers, he married then 64-year-old Pilar Jamias y Ver, a teacher from Sarrat, Ilocos Norte, in 1939 since his Church permits married clergy, but he died the following year on 1 September 1940 due to natural causes (cerebral hemorrhage), aged 80. Although he had for many years opposed celibacy among the priesthood, he himself was not married until the age of 79. Aglipay held the position of Supreme Bishop until his death. His remains were interred at the Cathedral of Saint Mary, Aglipay National Shrine in Batac, Ilocos Norte.

Aglipay was on trial calendars in the Episcopal Church's calendar of saints in the years 2009 and 2015 but the aforementioned calendars were never made official and his feast is not part of current proposals.

The municipality of Batac, Ilocos Norte annually celebrates the 1st day of September as a special non-working holiday to commemorate the death anniversary of Aglipay, known as the "Gregorio L. Aglipay Day", which was enacted on February 10, 1989 as per Republic Act No. 6701.

References

Sources
 Halili, Christine N. (2004) Philippine History, pp 192–93. .

External links

 
 Correspondence of Supreme Bishop Gregorio Aglipay (1902-1905)
 The historical records of Archbishop Gregorio Aglipay of the Independent Church of the Philippines are in the Harvard Divinity School Library at Harvard Divinity School in Cambridge, Massachusetts.

1860 births
1940 deaths
People from Batac
Ilocano people
Colegio de San Juan de Letran alumni
Filipino Christian religious leaders
Paramilitary Filipinos
People of the Philippine Revolution
People of the Philippine–American War
Candidates in the 1935 Philippine presidential election
Catholic Church in the Philippines
University of Santo Tomas alumni
People excommunicated by the Catholic Church
Anglican saints
Philippine Independent Church
Members of the Malolos Congress
Filipino Freemasons
Members of the Philippine Independent Church
Bishops of Independent Catholic denominations